Sophia Law may refer to:

Sophia Grieve, née Sophia Law, herbalist and horticulturist
Sophia Law (daughter of Jude Law)
Sophia Law School, at Sophia University